Høybråten is a residential area in the north-eastern part (Stovner bydel) of Norway's capital Oslo. Høybråten has its own church, schools and railway station.

Sports 
Høybråten Basketball Club (HBBK) won 16 Norwegian woman championships in basketball uninterrupted for 15 years (1981 to 1995), as well as in 1998. It earned them a place in the Guinness Book of Records. Høybråten og Stovner IL (HSIL) took the championship gold in cross-country relay race for women in 2003 and 2007, the first time with Kristin Stormer Steira on the team.

Noted people related to Høybråten 
 Thor Gjermund Eriksen, former editor of Dagbladet (2003–06), now Director of Broadcasting in NRK
 Jon Knudsen, soccer keeper who debuted on the national men's team in 2008
 Odd Nordhoug, author and professor at the Norwegian School
 Orji Okoroafor, finalist in Idol (TV program) in 2003, actor and basketball player
 Afshan Rafiq, Right Politician, former MP and former member of the Oslo City Council

References

External links 

100 years on Høybråten – anniversary of the first settlement
Team-bonding on Høybråten – about Høybråten and Stovner ILs football
Høybråten got dream school – see also: the finest school
Høybråten has the nation's best post-in-shop

Neighbourhoods of Oslo